Majestic 12 is a purported secret committee commissioned by the U.S. government.

Majestic 12 may also refer to:

Majestic 12 (Deus Ex), a fictional organization from the video game Deus Ex
The Majestic Twelve, a team of American superheroes from the Zatch Bell! anime (featured in season 1 ep. 49 & season 2 ep. 67)
Super Space Invaders '91, an arcade video game also known as Majestic Twelve: The Space Invaders Part IV